Goodradigbeeon is an extinct genus of buchanosteid arthrodire placoderm. Its fossils have been found in Emsian-aged marine strata from the Taemas-Wee Jasper reef of New South Wales, Australia and the type species is G. australianum.

The holotype was discovered near the Goodradigbee River by Harry A. Toombs and was described by White (1978).

References

Buchanosteidae
Placoderms of Australia
Fossil taxa described in 1978